Just a Boy is the second album by English singer-songwriter, Leo Sayer, and was released in 1974. It features his interpretations of two songs ("One Man Band" and "Giving It All Away") written by Sayer and David Courtney for The Who's lead vocalist Roger Daltrey's debut album, Daltrey. Sayer's singles "One Man Band" and "Long Tall Glasses" both hit the charts in the U.K. and around the world. Leo Sayer was now popular in Europe and made many promotional appearances there. He headlined in Paris at The Theatre D’ Champs Elysees, the theatre known as the home of his then-hero, mime artist Marcel Marceau.

Album cover artwork
The cover is a painting by Humphrey Butler-Bowden. It is a tribute to Antoine de Saint-Exupéry's artwork for his famous novella The Little Prince. The album's back cover pointedly depicted a group of new Sayers giving Pierrot the elbow.

Recording
Adam Faith, David Courtney and Sayer had already started work on the album, cutting "One Man Band" while Sayer was on an American tour. More recording took place in London. This time the recording went smoothly and the right results were quickly accomplished. Some of the songs, like "Long Tall Glasses", were written in the studio.  Roger Daltrey had first recorded Sayer's songs, "One Man Band" and "Giving It All Away" on his 1973 debut solo album, Daltrey.

A cover of the song "I Can Dance (Long Tall Glasses)" by the Canadian band Shooter hit the Canadian charts the same week as the Sayer original. The Sayer version reached No. 18, where the Shooter version reached No. 22, both on 3 May chart.

Track listing
All lyrics by Leo Sayer and music by David Courtney.

Side one
"Telepath" – 3:12
"Train" – 4:25
"The Bells of St Mary's" – 3:36
"One Man Band" – 3:35
"In My Life" – 3:23

Side two
"When I Came Home This Morning" – 5:17
"Long Tall Glasses (I Can Dance)" – 3:19
"Another Time" – 3:26
"Solo" – 3:59
"Giving it All Away" – 3:52

Personnel 
 Leo Sayer – vocals
 David Courtney – acoustic piano (1, 8, 10)
 Cliff Hall – acoustic piano (2, 3, 7, 9)
 David Rose – acoustic piano (4, 5, 6)
 John Mealing – organ (5)
 Paul Keogh – guitars (2, 3, 5, 7, 8, 9)
 James Litherland – guitars (4, 5, 6)
 Keith Nelson – banjo (7)
 Dave Markee – bass (2, 3, 7, 8, 9)
 Bill Smith – bass (4, 5, 6)
 Theo Thunder – drums (2-7, 9)
 Michael Giles – drums (8)
 Andrew Powell – string, woodwind and brass arrangements
 Jeanie Greene – backing vocals
 Barry St. John – backing vocals (5)
 Liza Strike – backing vocals (5)
 Lucas Piccoli – inspiration

Production 
 David Courtney – producer
 Adam Faith – producer 
 Louis Austin – engineer 
 Martin Birch – engineer
 George Sloan – tape operator 
 Paul "Chas" Watkins – tape operator 
 Terry O'Neill – photography, back cover conception
 Humphrey Butler-Bowdon – cover painting

Production
Producers: David Courtney, Adam Faith

Charts

Year-end charts

Singles

References

External links
 

1974 albums
Chrysalis Records albums
Leo Sayer albums
Warner Records albums